Tehachapi News is the local print and online source for news and events affecting the residents and businesses in Tehachapi, California.

Tehachapi News is considered a Wednesday publication and is available through home delivery and at rack locations throughout the area.  The newspaper is printed every Monday night, delivered to Tehachapi from Bakersfield Tuesday morning, and available at Tehachapi stands most everywhere by Tuesday around noon.

History
The newspaper descends from a publication started in 1899 and has continued since then. The Tehachapi News now is owned by the Bakersfield Californian. On Jan. 1, 2018, TBC Media will be taking over all operations and will be the employer for all employees of the Bakersfield Californian, along with Tehachapi News. This transition was announced recently to all employees in November 2017.

When Claudia Elliott, then-editor and general manager of the Tehachapi News retired in July, 2015, Louis Amestoy, vice president of content of the Bakersfield Californian assumed editing duties on an interim basis.

Stephanie Ursua, a lifelong Tehachapi resident, became business manager of Tehachapi News in July, 2015.

See also

External links
 Official Tehachapi News website

Weekly newspapers published in California
Tehachapi, California
Mass media in Kern County, California